Channel One TV (formerly TV Channel One) is a television channel in Albania.

Before establishing the new channel, Channel One TV was called TV Channel One and before that Junior TV, a 24-hour news television. In late 2012, the channel was closed and within a month, the strategy and name changed, with new studios being built.

One of the changes included changing the picture format to 16:9 widescreen.

Programs

TV programs made and broadcast by Channel One

See also
Communications in Albania

External links 
 

Television networks in Albania
Television channels and stations established in 2013
2013 establishments in Albania
Mass media in Tirana
Television channel articles with incorrect naming style